Douglas James Kingsriter (born January 29, 1950) is a former American football tight end.  He played three seasons for the Minnesota Vikings of the NFL from 1973 to 1975.  He finished his NFL career with 7 receptions for 116 yards in 28 games.  He played in Super Bowl VIII and Super Bowl IX for the Vikings  In Super Bowl VIII he caught one pass for seven yards and also made a key block on Fran Tarkenton's run for the Vikings' only touchdown.

He played college football for the Minnesota Golden Gophers.  He was named to the College Football All-America Team by the Associated Press in 1971.  He was drafted by the Vikings in the 6th round of the 1973 NFL draft.

After football, Kingsriter went into the real estate business and later into publishing books and musicals for children.  He also worked for the Lance Armstrong Foundation and the Minneapolis Heart Institute Foundation.

References

1950 births
Living people
American football tight ends
Minnesota Golden Gophers football players
Minnesota Vikings players
All-American college football players
People from Little Falls, Minnesota
Players of American football from Minnesota